David Malcolm Nott  (born 1956) is a Welsh consultant surgeon who works mainly in London hospitals as a general and vascular surgeon, but also volunteers to work in disaster and war zones. Having recognised that training others could greatly increase his capacity to help, Nott established the David Nott Foundation, along with his wife Elly, to organise training in emergency surgery for others working in war and disaster zones.  He has been honoured for this dangerous work and is now often styled the "Indiana Jones of surgery".

Education and family
Nott was born in Carmarthen in 1956 and lived with his grandparents at Trelech, near Carmarthen, until the age of four. He then lived in the Midlands and Rochdale from where he attended Hulme Grammar School. His father, Malcolm George Nott, was born in Burma and educated in Madras, India, and was half-Indian and half-Burmese. He was an orthopaedic and trauma surgeon, specialising in hip replacement; his mother, born Yvonne Jones, was a nurse from Wales. His father encouraged Nott to follow him into a medical career, and also inspired his son's later war work by taking him to see the 1984 film The Killing Fields.

Nott was not successful at school initially but, after resitting his A-Levels, he studied medicine at the universities of St Andrews and Manchester, graduating in 1981.

As a child, often left on his own, Nott was fascinated with building model aircraft and later learned to fly, gaining both a private pilot licence and a commercial pilot licence. He became an air transport pilot and flew for Hamlin Jet in Luton,  as a side job, for about ten years.

Surgery
During his medical training in Manchester and Liverpool, he was attracted to surgery. He took a special interest in vascular surgery after watching a Liverpool surgeon, Peter Harris, save someone by operating on their ruptured aortic aneurysm. He combined this with general surgery, practising at London hospitals including Charing Cross, Chelsea and Westminster, St Mary's and the Royal Marsden. As a vascular surgeon, he specialises in keyhole techniques, especially for repairs of abdominal aortic aneurysms, and distal arterial bypasses. In 1999, he was the first surgeon in the world to perform a femoral-popliteal bypass using only laparoscopic techniques. His other work includes appendectomies; hernia repairs; removal of lipomas and haemorrhoids; and treatment of varicose veins using ligation or sclerotherapy.

He began working in disaster and war zones in 1993, when he saw footage of the war in Sarajevo. He has worked in disaster and war zones for several weeks each year since then, working as a volunteer surgeon for agencies such as Médecins Sans Frontières and the Red Cross.  He has also served in a similar capacity for the Royal Auxiliary Air Force, where he holds the rank of wing commander.

The locations have included Afghanistan, Bosnia, Chad, Darfur, Gaza, Haiti, Iraq, Libya, Sierra Leone and opposition-held areas of Syria. Between 2013 and 2014 Nott trained and assisted medical students and other doctors to conduct trauma surgeries in opposition-held East Aleppo.

During the 2022 Russian invasion of Ukraine, he visited Ukraine to train surgeons, in conjunction with UOSSM International.

David Nott Foundation
See main article: David Nott Foundation

On a mission to Libya, Nott began to realise that a lot of the medical staff there were not trained for the kinds of injuries they were encountering. He began running a Definitive Surgical Trauma Skills workshop for his colleagues in the hospital. This experience, in part, led to Nott setting up the David Nott Foundation in 2015, along with his wife Elly, who led the charity as Chief Executive until 2019.

The David Nott Foundation provides surgical training for doctors and nurses who work in war and disaster zones. The training courses focus on life saving surgical procedures that are crucial in austere environments, with doctors given the opportunity to practice on real bodies, supported by other resources, including videos and anatomical models. The courses are run with the Royal College of Surgeons for five days every six months and are fully funded by the foundation through a scholarship scheme for surgeons working in hostile conditions.

These courses are also delivered on the front line, where doctors are unable to leave their posts, and have already been held in Yemen, Libya and Iraq, among others. The front line Hostile Environment Surgical Training courses (HEST) last for four days. They focus on a wide range of skills, including treating gun shot wounds and carrying out vascular surgery, with the help of a full-body simulator. The simulator is a perfectly accurate model of the human body and can be used to demonstrate various procedures.

Honours and awards
Nott was admitted as a fellow to the Royal College of Surgeons in 1989. He was appointed an Officer of the Order of the British Empire in the 2012 Birthday Honours. In 2016 he received the Robert Burns Humanitarian Award and the Pride of Britain Award. He received honorary degrees from the University of Salford in 2015, from the University of St Andrews in 2017, and was given a honorary doctorate by the University of Wales Trinity Saint David in July 2017. Nott was shortlisted for the RSL Christopher Bland Prize for his book War Doctor in 2020.

Personal life
In 2015 Nott married Eleanor Jupp, and their daughter was born in the same year. Eleanor, known as "Elly", was formerly an analyst with the Institute of Strategic Studies.

In 2014 he had lunch with the Queen. When he found it difficult to speak about his traumatic experiences, she put him at ease by inviting him to take twenty minutes (and some dog biscuits) to befriend her corgis.

In 2016 Nott was a guest on BBC Radio 4's Desert Island Discs:  his music choices included "Gimme Shelter" by The Rolling Stones' and "Fix You" by Coldplay, his favourite being "Good Golly, Miss Molly" by Little Richard. His book choice was Kallimni Arabi Mazboot, to help him learn Arabic. Also in 2016 he spoke of his Christian faith on BBC1's Victoria Derbyshire.

In 2020 he appeared in Christmas University Challenge in the Manchester team which was beaten in the final by The Courtauld Institute of Art.

Publications
 
  In February 2019, War Doctor was BBC Radio 4's Book of the Week.

References

External links
 The David Nott Foundation – his charitable foundation which provides medical training for disasters and wars
 Desert Island Discs – his favourite records and interview by Kirsty Young, first broadcast on 5 June 2016

1956 births
Living people
Alumni of the University of Manchester
Alumni of the University of St Andrews
Fellows of the Royal College of Surgeons
Officers of the Order of the British Empire
People educated at Oldham Hulme Grammar School
People from Carmarthen
British vascular surgeons
Welsh surgeons
Royal Air Force Medical Service officers
British people of Burmese descent
British people of Indian descent
Welsh people of Indian descent
Welsh people of Burmese descent
Commercial aviators